Hussain Rasheed Ahmed (born March 18, 1957) is a Maldivian Sunni Islamic scholar (Shaafi'ee school of belief) and political leader in Republic of the Maldives.  He is also the first elected President of Adhaalath Party (Adhaalath Party), a political party in the Republic of Maldives known for its Sunni Islamic positions.
He is very fluent in  Arabic, Urdu (other than "Dhivehi" Maldivian official language). 
Sheikh Hussain Rasheed is well known for his controversial public talks on political issues (especially regarding the former president of Maldives, Maumoon Abdul Qayyoom) and his Islamic lectures and sermons (Khutbahs). He's famous as "an Islamic religious politician in the Maldives, the only one who can make tough decisions wisely, find sustainable solutions for different types of controversial issues." by some of his supporters. From President Mohamed Nasheed's government, first he was appointed as the co-chair of "Riyaasee Commission", then he was appointed as Minister of State for Home Affairs (In President Nasheed's government-24 Nov 2009 to 23 Dec 2010), 23 December 2010 he was appointed as Minister of State for Islamic Affairs (in President Nasheed's government-23 Dec 2010 to 7 Feb 2012,as President Nasheed's government was brought down by a coup).

Family
Sheikh Hussain Rasheed's father is a famous, well-recognized and respected personality in the South of Maldives; Ahmed Manikfaan (Seenu Hithadhoo Thubbeege Ali Thakkhaanuge Ahmed Manikfaan). His mother, Aishath Manikfaan (Ali Manikuge Aisha Manikfaan) was a niece of Sheikh Hussain Sharafuddin Al-Azhary (Sheikh Hussain Rahaa). He has 3 brothers; Ibrahim Rasheed Ahmed (eldest brother of Sheikh Hussain Rasheed), Mohamed Rasheed Ahmed (elder brother of Sheikh Hussain Rasheed) and Sheikh Abdul Rasheed Ahmed (younger brother of  Sheikh Hussain Rasheed) and 7 children: Aisha Hussain Rasheed, Mohamed Hussain Rasheed, Abdulla Hussain Rasheed, Ibrahim Hussain Rasheed, Ismail Hussain Rasheed, Amina Hussain Rasheed and Ameera Hussain Rasheed.

Education
 Quran, Islamic Studies, Arabic and Dhivehi Language - Makthabul U'loom / Addu Hithadhoo (from his Father Ahmed Manikfaan)
 1970 - Madrasathul Husainiyya / Addu Hithadhoo
 1971-1972 - Nooraani School / Addu Hithadhoo
 Memorizing the Quran:
>1972 - Jamia Dharul Uloom, Daabeel / Gujrat / India

>1973 - Jamia Dharul Uloom, Taraj / India
 Secondary / Higher Secondary - Jamia Darul Uloom Matliwala / Bharuch / India
 BA in Islamic Studies - Jamia Tha'leemaath Islamiyya / Pakistan
 Gen.Diploma in Arabic Teaching - Jamia Ummul Qura / Mecca / Saudi Arabia
 Diploma in Arabic & Islamic Teaching - King Saud University / Riyad / Saudi Arabia

Occupations
 Minister of State for Islamic Affairs (in President Nasheed's government-23 Dec 2010 to 7 Feb 2012, as President Nasheed's government was brought down by a coup)
 Minister of State for Home Affairs (In President Nasheed's government-24 Nov 2009 to 23 Dec 2010, as President Nasheed changed him to Minister of State for Islamic Affairs)
 Co-Chair of "Riyaasee Commission" in Presindent Nasheed's government
 Member of Fiqh Academy Maldives 
 Former President of Adhaalath Party (2006 to 2011)

Social services
 He is a well-known teacher of so many Maldivians (subjects taught: Arabic, Qur'an, Islamic Studies).
 He has given so many public (Islamic) Lectures and "Dhars" (Lessons of Islamic knowledge).
 Published so many books of Islamic knowledge, Dhivehi Bas (Maldivian Language) and others. The latest publication he has started is Translating "Saheeh Muslim" in to "Dhivehi" (Maldivian Language) with explanations, in reference on Imaam Nawawi's publication. Till now 3 parts of this book has come to the market, out of the 12 parts expected of it.

References

Living people
Government ministers of the Maldives
Adhaalath Party politicians
Maldivian Muslims
1957 births
Maldivian religious leaders
Muslim Brotherhood leaders
King Saud University alumni
People from Addu City